Aciagrion fragilis  is a species of damselfly in the family Coenagrionidae,
commonly known as a blue slim. 
It is a small, slender damselfly, the male is blue and black.
It has been recorded from northern Australia, New Guinea and the Lesser Sunda Islands in Indonesia,
where it inhabits still waters and swamps.

Etymology
The species name fragilis is a Latin word meaning fragile, or easily broken. In 1906, Robin Tillyard named this species probably in contrast to other members of the genus Ischnura, where it had been provisionally placed.

Gallery

See also
 List of Odonata species of Australia

References 

Coenagrionidae
Odonata of Asia
Odonata of Australia
Insects of Australia
Insects of New Guinea
Insects of Indonesia
Insects of Southeast Asia
Taxa named by Robert John Tillyard
Insects described in 1906
Damselflies
Taxobox binomials not recognized by IUCN